Wollerton Halt was a small railway station in the village of Wollerton in Shropshire, England. The station was on the Wellington and Drayton Railway between Market Drayton and Wellington. It was closed at the beginning of September 1963.

References

Further reading

External links
 2008 photographs from the station

Disused railway stations in Shropshire
Former Great Western Railway stations
Railway stations in Great Britain opened in 1931
Railway stations in Great Britain closed in 1963